Nepeta is a genus of flowering plants in the family Lamiaceae. The genus name is reportedly in reference to Nepete, an ancient Etruscan city. There are about 250 species.

The genus is native to Europe, Asia, and Africa, and has also naturalized in North America.

Some members of this group are known as catnip or catmint because of their effect on house cats – the nepetalactone contained in some Nepeta species binds to the olfactory receptors of cats, typically resulting in temporary euphoria.

Description 
Most of the species are herbaceous perennial plants, but some are annuals. They have sturdy stems with opposite heart-shaped, green to gray-green leaves. Nepeta plants are usually aromatic in foliage and flowers.

The tubular flowers can be lavender, blue, white, pink, or lilac, and spotted with tiny lavender-purple dots. The flowers are located in verticillasters grouped on spikes; or the verticillasters are arranged in opposite cymes, racemes, or panicles – toward the tip of the stems.

The calyx is tubular or campanulate, they are slightly curved or straight, and the limbs are often 2-lipped with five teeth. The lower lip is larger, with 3-lobes, and the middle lobe is the largest. The flowers have 4 hairless stamens that are nearly parallel, and they ascend under the upper lip of the corolla. Two stamen are longer and stamens of pistillate flowers are rudimentary. The style protrudes outside of the mouth of the flowers.

The fruits are nutlets, which are oblong-ovoid, ellipsoid, ovoid, or obovoid in shape. The surfaces of the nutlets can be slightly ribbed, smooth or warty.

Selected species 
 Some species formerly classified as Nepeta are now in the genera Dracocephalum, Glechoma, and Calamintha .

Species include:

Nepeta adenophyta Hedge
Nepeta agrestis Loisel.
Nepeta alaghezi Pojark.
Nepeta alatavica Lipsky
Nepeta algeriensis Noë
Nepeta amicorum Rech.f.
Nepeta amoena Stapf
Nepeta anamurensis Gemici & Leblebici
Nepeta annua Pall.
Nepeta apuleji Ucria
Nepeta argolica Bory & Chaub.
Nepeta assadii Jamzad
Nepeta assurgens Hausskn. & Bornm.
Nepeta astorensis Shinwari & Chaudhri
Nepeta atlantica Ball
Nepeta autraniana Bornm.
Nepeta azurea R.Br. ex Benth.
Nepeta badachschanica Kudrjasch.
Nepeta bakhtiarica Rech.f.
Nepeta ballotifolia Hochst. ex A.Rich.
Nepeta balouchestanica Jamzad & Ingr.
Nepeta barfakensis Rech.f.
Nepeta baytopii Hedge & Lamond
Nepeta bazoftica Jamzad
Nepeta bellevii Prain
Nepeta betonicifolia C.A.Mey.
Nepeta binaloudensis Jamzad
Nepeta bodeana Bunge
Nepeta × boissieri Willk.
Nepeta bokhonica Jamzad
Nepeta bombaiensis Dalzell
Nepeta bornmuelleri Hausskn. ex Bornm.
Nepeta botschantzevii Czern.
Nepeta brachyantha Rech.f. & Edelb.
Nepeta bracteata Benth.
Nepeta brevifolia C.A.Mey.
Nepeta bucharica Lipsky
Nepeta caerulea Aiton
Nepeta caesarea Boiss.
Nepeta campestris Benth.
Nepeta camphorata Boiss. & Heldr.
Nepeta × campylantha Rech.f.
Nepeta cataria L.
Nepeta cephalotes Boiss.
Nepeta chionophila Boiss. & Hausskn.
Nepeta ciliaris Benth.
Nepeta cilicica Boiss. ex Benth.
Nepeta clarkei Hook.f.
Nepeta coerulescens Maxim.
Nepeta concolor Boiss. & Heldr. ex Benth.
Nepeta conferta Hedge & Lamond
Nepeta congesta Fisch. & C.A.Mey.
Nepeta connata Royle ex Benth.
Nepeta consanguinea Pojark.
Nepeta crinita Montbret & Aucher ex Benth.
Nepeta crispa Willd.
Nepeta curviflora Boiss.
Nepeta cyanea Steven
Nepeta cyrenaica Quézel & Zaffran
Nepeta czegemensis Pojark.
Nepeta daenensis Boiss.
Nepeta deflersiana Schweinf. ex Hedge
Nepeta densiflora Kar. & Kir.
Nepeta dentata C.Y.Wu & S.J.Hsuan
Nepeta denudata Benth.
Nepeta dirmencii Yild. & Dinç
Nepeta discolor Royle ex Benth.
Nepeta distans Royle
Nepeta duthiei Prain & Mukerjee
Nepeta elliptica Royle ex Benth.
Nepeta elymaitica Bornm.
Nepeta erecta (Royle ex Benth.) Benth.
Nepeta eremokosmos Rech.f.
Nepeta eremophila Hausskn. & Bornm.
Nepeta eriosphaera Rech.f. & Köie
Nepeta eriostachya Benth.
Nepeta ernesti-mayeri Diklic & V.Nikolic
Nepeta everardii S.Moore
Nepeta × faassenii Bergmans ex Stearn
Nepeta flavida Hub.-Mor.
Nepeta floccosa Benth.
Nepeta foliosa Moris
Nepeta fordii Hemsl.
Nepeta formosa Kudrjasch.
Nepeta freitagii Rech.f.
Nepeta glechomifolia (Dunn) Hedge
Nepeta gloeocephala Rech.f.
Nepeta glomerata Montbret & Aucher ex Benth.
Nepeta glomerulosa Boiss.
Nepeta glutinosa Benth.
Nepeta gontscharovii Kudrjasch.
Nepeta govaniana (Wall. ex Benth.) Benth.
Nepeta graciliflora Benth.
Nepeta granatensis Boiss.
Nepeta grandiflora M.Bieb.
Nepeta grata Benth.
Nepeta griffithii Hedge
Nepeta heliotropifolia Lam.
Nepeta hemsleyana Oliv. ex Prain
Nepeta henanensis C.S.Zhu
Nepeta hindostana (B.Heyne ex Roth) Haines
Nepeta hispanica Boiss. & Reut.
Nepeta hormozganica Jamzad
Nepeta humilis Benth.
Nepeta hymenodonta Boiss.
Nepeta isaurica Boiss. & Heldr. ex Benth.
Nepeta ispahanica Boiss.
Nepeta italica L.
Nepeta jakupicensis Micevski
Nepeta jomdaensis H.W.Li
Nepeta juncea Benth.
Nepeta knorringiana Pojark.
Nepeta koeieana Rech.f.
Nepeta kokamirica Regel
Nepeta kokanica Regel
Nepeta komarovii E.A.Busch
Nepeta kotschyi Boiss.
Nepeta kurdica Hausskn. & Bornm.
Nepeta kurramensis Rech.f.
Nepeta ladanolens Lipsky
Nepeta laevigata (D.Don) Hand.-Mazz.
Nepeta lagopsis Benth.
Nepeta lamiifolia Willd.
Nepeta lamiopsis Benth. ex Hook.f.
Nepeta lasiocephala Benth.
Nepeta latifolia DC.
Nepeta leucolaena Benth. ex Hook.f.
Nepeta linearis Royle ex Benth.
Nepeta lipskyi Kudrjasch.
Nepeta longibracteata Benth.
Nepeta longiflora Vent.
Nepeta longituba Pojark.
Nepeta ludlow-hewittii Blakelock
Nepeta macrosiphon Boiss.
Nepeta mahanensis Jamzad & M.Simmonds
Nepeta manchuriensis S.Moore
Nepeta mariae Regel
Nepeta maussarifii Lipsky
Nepeta melissifolia Lam.
Nepeta membranifolia C.Y.Wu
Nepeta menthoides Boiss. & Buhse
Nepeta meyeri Benth.
Nepeta micrantha Bunge
Nepeta minuticephala Jamzad
Nepeta mirzayanii Rech.f. & Esfand.
Nepeta mollis Benth.
Nepeta monocephala Rech.f.
Nepeta monticola Kudr.
Nepeta multibracteata Desf.
Nepeta multicaulis Mukerjee
Nepeta multifida L.
Nepeta natanzensis Jamzad
Nepeta nawarica Rech.f.
Nepeta nepalensis Spreng.
Nepeta nepetella L.
Nepeta nepetellae Forssk.
Nepeta nepetoides (Batt. ex Pit.) Harley
Nepeta nervosa Royle ex Benth.
Nepeta nuda L.
Nepeta obtusicrena Boiss. & Kotschy ex Hedge
Nepeta odorifera Lipsky
Nepeta olgae Regel
Nepeta orphanidea Boiss.
Nepeta pabotii Mouterde
Nepeta paktiana Rech.f.
Nepeta pamirensis Franch.
Nepeta parnassica Heldr. & Sart.
Nepeta paucifolia Mukerjee
Nepeta persica Boiss.
Nepeta petraea Benth.
Nepeta phyllochlamys P.H.Davis
Nepeta pilinux P.H.Davis
Nepeta podlechii Rech.f.
Nepeta podostachys Benth.
Nepeta pogonosperma Jamzad & Assadi
Nepeta polyodonta Rech.f.
Nepeta praetervisa Rech.f.
Nepeta prattii H.Lév.
Nepeta prostrata Benth.
Nepeta pseudokokanica Pojark.
Nepeta pubescens Benth.
Nepeta pungens (Bunge) Benth.
Nepeta racemosa Lam.
Nepeta raphanorhiza Benth.
Nepeta rechingeri Hedge
Nepeta rivularis Bornm.
Nepeta roopiana Bordz.
Nepeta rtanjensis Diklic & Milojevic
Nepeta rubella A.L.Budantzev
Nepeta rugosa Benth.
Nepeta saccharata Bunge
Nepeta santoana Popov
Nepeta saturejoides Boiss.
Nepeta schiraziana Boiss.
Nepeta schmidii Rech.f.
Nepeta schugnanica Lipsky
Nepeta scordotis L.
Nepeta septemcrenata Ehrenb. ex Benth.
Nepeta sessilis C.Y.Wu & S.J.Hsuan
Nepeta shahmirzadensis Assadi & Jamzad
Nepeta sheilae Hedge & R.A.King
Nepeta sibirica L.
Nepeta sorgerae Hedge & Lamond
Nepeta sosnovskyi Askerova
Nepeta souliei H.Lév.
Nepeta spathulifera Benth.
Nepeta sphaciotica P.H.Davis
Nepeta spruneri Boiss.
Nepeta stachyoides Coss. ex Batt.
Nepeta staintonii Hedge
Nepeta stenantha Kotschy & Boiss.
Nepeta stewartiana Diels
Nepeta straussii Hausskn. & Bornm.
Nepeta stricta (Banks & Sol.) Hedge & Lamond
Nepeta suavis Stapf
Nepeta subcaespitosa Jehan
Nepeta subhastata Regel
Nepeta subincisa Benth.
Nepeta subintegra Maxim.
Nepeta subsessilis Maxim.
Nepeta sudanica F.W.Andrews
Nepeta sulfuriflora P.H.Davis
Nepeta sulphurea C. Koch
Nepeta sungpanensis C.Y.Wu
Nepeta supina Steven
Nepeta taxkorganica Y.F.Chang
Nepeta tenuiflora Diels
Nepeta tenuifolia Benth.
Nepeta teucriifolia Willd.
Nepeta teydea Webb & Berthel.
Nepeta tibestica Maire
Nepeta × tmolea Boiss.
Nepeta trachonitica Post
Nepeta transiliensis Pojark.
Nepeta trautvetteri Boiss. & Buhse
Nepeta trichocalyx Greuter & Burdet
Nepeta tuberosa L.
Nepeta tytthantha Pojark.
Nepeta uberrima Rech.f.
Nepeta ucranica L.
Nepeta veitchii Duthie
Nepeta velutina Pojark.
Nepeta viscida Boiss.
Nepeta vivianii (Coss.) Bég. & Vacc.
Nepeta wettsteinii Heinr.Braun
Nepeta wilsonii Duthie
Nepeta woodiana Hedge
Nepeta yanthina Franch.
Nepeta yesoensis (Franch. & Sav.) B.D.Jacks.
Nepeta zandaensis H.W.Li
Nepeta zangezura Grossh.

Gallery

Uses

Cultivation 
Some Nepeta species are cultivated as ornamental plants. They can be drought tolerant – water conserving, often deer repellent, with long bloom periods from late spring to autumn. Some species also have repellent properties to insect pests, including aphids and squash bugs, when planted in a garden.

Nepeta species are used as food plants by the larvae of some Lepidoptera (butterfly and moth) species including Coleophora albitarsella, and as nectar sources for pollinators, such as honey bees and hummingbirds.

Selected ornamental species
 Nepeta cataria (catnip, catswort) – the "true catnip", cultivated as an ornamental plant, has become an invasive species in some habitats.
 Nepeta grandiflora (giant catmint, Caucasus catmint) – lusher than true catnip and has dark green leaves and dark blue flowers.
 Nepeta × faassenii (garden catmint) – a hybrid of garden source with gray-green foliage and lavender flowers. It is drought-tolerant and deer-resistant.  The cultivar 'Walker's Low' was named Perennial of the Year for 2007 by the Perennial Plant Association.
 Nepeta racemosa (raceme catnip) – commonly used in landscaping. It is hardy, rated for USDA hardiness zone 5b.

References

Further reading

External links 

 GRIN Species Records of Nepeta
 [http://www.efloras.org/browse.aspx?flora_id=110&start_taxon_id=122138 Flora of Nepal: Nepeta']
 Drugs.com: Catnip
  "Nepetalactone: What is in catnip anyway?"
 HowStuffWorks, Inc.: How does catnip work?
 Sciencedaily.com: "Catnip Repels Mosquitoes More Effectively Than DEET" – reported at the 2001 American Chemical Society meeting''.

 
Lamiaceae genera
Perennial plants
Cat attractants
Drought-tolerant plants
Herbs
Medicinal plants
Garden plants of Africa
Garden plants of Asia
Garden plants of Europe
Taxa named by Carl Linnaeus